Universalglot is an a posteriori international auxiliary language published by the French linguist Jean Pirro in 1868 in Tentative d'une langue universelle, Enseignement, grammaire, vocabulaire. Preceding Volapük by a decade and Esperanto by nearly 20 years, Universalglot has been called the first "complete auxiliary-language system based on the common elements in national languages". Pirro gave it more than 7,000 basic words and numerous prefixes, enabling the development of a very extensible vocabulary.

In his book describing his own language project Novial, Otto Jespersen praised the language, writing that it is "one to which I constantly recur with the greatest admiration, because it embodies principles which were not recognized till much later". The magazine Cosmoglotta for the auxiliary language Interlingue (then known as Occidental) also praised the language in 1931 for its readability and analysis of international words (in particular the suffix -ion) and regretted that its creator had been forgotten in contrast with the creators of Esperanto and Volapük:Monuments have been erected to the glory of Zamenhof and the name Schleyer has been engraved in marble. Their precursor and master, Pirro, has been honored - with oblivion.

Linguistic properties

Orthography 
The Universalglot alphabet contains 27 letters. It uses 24 of the 26 letters of the ISO basic Latin alphabet, "w" and "y" are not used, and has three additional letters "œ", "σ" and "ü".

The non-basic Latin letters are pronounced
"Œ/œ" is used for French œ or German ö
"Σ/σ" as  like English "sh"
"Ü/ü" as  like German "ü" or French "u"

The basic Latin letters whose pronunciation differs from their pronunciation in English are:
"c" is like "ts", "j" is like "y", 
"q" only appears in the digraph "qu" and this is like "kw"
"a", "e", "i", "o", "u" are pronounced as in Spanish. Vowels in sequence are pronounced separately.

Word classes

Nouns and adjectives 
Nouns (substantives) are invariable except for the feminine form, which ends in "in". Adjectives are completely invariable E.g. (singular): El old man, el old manin. E.g. 2 (plural): Li old man, Li old manin.

All words can be used as nouns with the help of an article.

Articles 
Only articles and pronouns have separate singular and plural forms, as follows:

 Singular: el (the), un (a/an)
 Plural: li (the)

Unmarked nouns will be considered plural: I hab kaval = I have horses.

Verbs 
The verbs all share the same easy conjugation:

Transitive verbs, such as loben (to praise) also have passive forms:
 esen lobed (to be praised)
 i ese lobed (I am praised)
 i esed lobed (I was praised)
 i esrai lobed (I will be praised)
 i esrais lobed (I would be praised)
 i esrai esed lobed (I will have been praised)
 i esrais esed lobed (I would have been praised)
 es lobed! (be praised!)

Passive verbs use esen for the perfect (have been). All other verbs use haben.

And reflexives:
 se loben (to praise oneself)
 i lobe me (I praise myself)
 i lobed me (I praised myself)
 i lobrai me (I will praise myself)
 i lobrais me (I would praise myself)

Adverbs 
da 'there', di 'here', fern 'far', pertot 'everywhere', post 'from behind', retro 'backward', sub 'down', up 'up', vo 'where?'

alterlit 'otherwise', hastlit 'quickly', insamel 'together', oft 'often', rarlit 'rarely', re 'again', so 'thus/so'

certlit 'certainly', ies 'yes', non 'no', potlit 'maybe' (possibly), villit 'gladly' (willingly)

alor 'so/then', altervolt 'formerly', ankor 'still', bald 'soon', ditdai 'today', heri 'yesterday', jam 'already', kras 'tomorrow', nonk 'never', nun 'now', postdit 'next/then', 'primlit 'first', semper 'always'

admindest 'at least', ben 'well', kom 'how', mal 'badly', mind 'few', molt 'many', prox 'almost/around', quant 'how many', sat 'enough', self 'self/even', talit 'that/so much', tant 'as much', totlit 'immediately', trop 'too', unlit 'only', vix 'scarcely'

Prepositions 
ad 'to', adkaus 'because of', de 'of', ex 'from', in 'in', inter 'among', kon 'with', kontra 'against', kontravil 'despite', ob 'in front of', per 'by', post 'after / according to', pre 'before', pro 'for', prox 'beside', retro 'behind', sin 'without', sub 'below', til 'until', tra 'across', um 'around', up 'on', uper 'over'

Prefixes 
an- (negative, un-), arki- (most, arch-), dis- (dis-), mis- (mis-), ob- (ob-), re- (re-), the prepositions, and inherited prefixes like ab-, de- and di-.

Numerals 
un (1), du (2), tri (3), quat (4), quint (5), sex (6), sept (7), okt (8), nov (9), dec (10)

11=undec, 12=dudec, 13=tridec etc.
20=duta, 30=trita, etc.
21=dutaun, 22=dutadu, 23=dutatri etc.

cent (100), mil (1000), milion (1,000,000)

El prim (the first), el duli (the second), el trili (the third) etc. el ultim (the last)
primlit (firstly), dulit (secondly), trilit (thirdly) etc.
1/2 = un midli, 3/4 = tri quatli

Pronouns 
 i (I), me (me, object—direct, indirect, of preposition), men (my, mine; pl. meni "meni bibel" my books)
 tu (you, singular), te (you, singular/object), ten (your(s) singular; pl. teni)
 il (he/she/it), eil (him/her/it, object), sen (his/her(s)/its; pl. seni)
 nos (we), enos (us, object) nor (our(s); pl. nori)
 vos (you, plural), evos (you, plural object), vor (your(s), plural; pl. vori): vor bibel (your (pl.) book), vori bibel (your (pl.) books)
 ili (they), eili (them, object), lor (their(s); pl. lori)

Interrogative and relative pronouns: ke (who(m), what), kei (pl. of ke)

 alter, alteri 'another, others'
 jed 'each'
 meri 'several'
 nul, nuli 'none'
 on 'one/you/they'
 self, selfi 'oneself, ones selves'
 tal, tali 'such a one, such ones'
 tot, toti 'all of it, all of them'
 un 'one, someone', uni 'some'

Conjunctions 

e 'and', kar 'because', ma 'but', o 'or'

den 'therefore', ed 'also', ferner 'furthermore', finitlit 'finally', indit 'however', kontra 'on the contrary', nonminder 'nonetheless', sekutlit 'consequently', uper 'in addition'

alorke 'when' (at that time), benke 'though', exke 'since', inditke 'during', ke 'that', kom 'as', perke 'because', postke 'following, proke 'so that', preke 'preceding', quan 'when' (at which time?), si 'indeed', so 'so that', tilke 'until'

Special word lists 
septin (week):
Lundai, Mardai, Erdai, Jovdai, Vendai, Samdai, Diodai = un septin
Li mens (months):
Januar, Februar, Mars, April, Mai, Juni, Juli, August, September, October, November, December = un jar

Examples of texts in Universalglot

Leter de grat (thankyou letter)
Men senior,
I grate vos pro el servnes ke vos habe donated ad me. Kred, men senior, ke in un simli fal vos pote konten up me.
Adcept el adsekurantnes de men kordli amiknes.

Konversatsion
Ben dai, Meni senior, i ese inkanted reinkontra evos; i habe videt evos in London, e ditdai nos finde enos in Skotland. dikt me ex ke land vos ese.
I habe perkursed el Holland, i habe visited seni principal citad, li Hollander ese molt amatli gent, ili ese mild e vorkli, lor konmerk ese molt extended, on finde Hollander in toti land e pertot ili ese amated  e prised.
Un ex enos ese ruser e du ese italier e el quatli ese deutsch; ma nos pote toti parlen insamel, den nos parle el universal glot.
Si nos vile venten in nor hostel, vos etrai (va mangear) kon enos, vos findrai da un ben tabel e ben knmer, fir e ben bet.

Excerpt from Mamud e sen minister
„Ke Dio adkorde un lang viv ad el sultan Mamud; so lang ke il governe enos, nos manku nonk (nequende) ruined dorf. 
Ili kontinuated, dikted el visir in terment (in fine), goderant se per el desolatsion, ke, kom ili pretende, propagate se mer e mer jed dai. Ma, kom tu varted, i viled non resten mer lang, den i denked tu poted esen anpatant (impatient) e tu vise (tu save) kom i trepide anplesen (desplacer) te. 
El stori dikted, ke el sultan esed exmoved per dit fabel, ke il rekonstrukted li citad e dorf; redukted el tribut, ex ke el land esed uperladed (supercargut); e, ex dit temp, il konsulted ei ben de sen popel."

References

External links
 Essai d'une langue universelle, par MM. Pirro et L. A. (French; dictionary includes English)

Constructed languages
International auxiliary languages
1868 introductions